Sri Lanka's electricity demand is currently met by nine thermal power stations, fifteen large hydroelectric power stations, and fifteen wind farms, with a smaller share from small hydro facilities and other renewables such as solar. Most hydroelectric and thermal/fossil fuel–based power stations in the country are owned and/or operated by the government via the state-run Ceylon Electricity Board (CEB), while the renewable energy sector consists mostly of privately run plants operating on a power purchase agreement with the CEB.

Non-renewable 
As of 2015, 1,464 MW of the total thermal installed capacity was from state-owned fossil fuel power stations: 900 MW from Lakvijaya, 380 MW from the state-owned portion of Kelanitissa, 160 MW from Sapugaskanda, and 24 MW from Uthuru Janani. The remaining 641 MW of the installed thermal capacity are from six privately owned power stations. All thermal power stations run on fuel oil, except Lakvijaya, which run on coal.

In an attempt to lower the current consumer tariff for electricity, the government has decided not to renew the power purchase agreements of privately owned thermal power stations when their licences expire, as it has done with the six now-decommissioned private power producers listed below. The government will utilize the new Sampur plant combined with new renewable sources to accommodate the lost private-sector capacity, with plans to introduce nuclear power after 2030.

The 500 MW Sampur Power Station was in early stages of development since 2006, but was subsequently cancelled in 2016 due environmental concerns. Prior to its cancellation, the Ministry of Power and Renewable Energy also made a statement that no more coal-fired power stations will be commissioned, making Lakvijaya the only coal-fired power station in the country. Any future thermal power stations will also be natural gas–run, to reduce the nation's carbon footprint.

Renewable

Hydroelectric 

Hydroelectricity has played a very significant role in the national installed power capacity since it was introduced in the 1950s, with over 50% of the total grid capacity met by hydroelectricity in 2000–2010. Hydroelectricity was popularized as early as the 1920s by Devapura Jayasena Wimalasurendra, who is considered as the "Father of Hydropower" in Sri Lanka. It lost its majority share on the power grid when further thermal power stations were introduced in 2010. The hydropower resource in Sri Lanka is divided into two main regions based on water resource, namely the Mahaweli Complex and Laxapana Complex.

While most hydroelectric power stations are named after their water source (i.e. the name of the dam and/or reservoir), a number of facilities have different names due to the fact that they are located larger distances apart (connected via underground penstocks). Further information on each power station is included in the corresponding water source article (i.e. dam).

Solar power 

Solar power is a relatively young segment in the energy industry of Sri Lanka. As of 2015, only a few grid-connected solar farms were operational, including a state-run facility. Despite at least half a dozen private companies applying for development permits for photovoltaic and solar thermal projects, most have not actually commenced construction.

Wind power 

Sri Lanka's wind power sector saw activity as early as 1988, when studies were conducted to build a pilot wind project in the Southern Province. More than a decade later, the state-owned 3 MW Hambantota Wind Farm was commissioned. The industry stayed dormant till 2003, when the National Renewable Energy Laboratory conducted further wind power studies in the island, before which the industry went into dormancy for a further seven years.

Unlike the other industries, Sri Lanka's wind energy industry witnessed a sudden boom in 2010, with the commissioning of the Mampuri Wind Farms, the first private-sector wind project in the country's history. It then suddenly crashed over the following four years after numerous scandals and hidden political dealings surfaced, involving key governing bodies such as the Sustainable Energy Authority and Ceylon Electricity Board, along with a number of senior individuals.

The last privately owned first-come, first-served style wind farm projects, the Pollupalai and Vallimunai Wind Farms, were completed in late 2014, by when the construction of new privately owned wind farms were suspended until further notice by presidential order. The largest private-sector beneficiaries of the "wind power boom" are WindForce and Senok, which currently own seven and three separate wind farms respectively, of the total of 14 privately owned wind farms in operation as at 2015. The other companies in the market include the semi-private LTL Holdings, Aitken Spence, and Willwind, which are currently operating four wind farms in total.

See also 
 Electricity sector in Sri Lanka
 India–Sri Lanka HVDC Interconnection

References

External links 

 Ceylon Electricity Board
 Ministry of Power & Renewable Energy
 Mahaweli Hydropower Complex
 Public Utilities Commission of Sri Lanka
 Sri Lanka Sustainable Energy Authority

 
Power stations
Power stations
Sri Lanka